Svend Erik Kristensen (born 24 June 1956) is a retired male long-distance runner from Denmark, who twice represented his native country at the European Athletics Championships during his career: 1982 and 1986. He is a four-time national marathon title  in the men's marathon: 1981, 1986, 1990 and 1991.

Achievements

External links 

 
 Profile at ARRS
 Danish profile (Internet Archive)

1956 births
Living people
Danish male long-distance runners
Danish male marathon runners